David Pugh (born 22 January 1947) is a Welsh former professional footballer who played as a winger in the Football League for Newport County, Chesterfield, Halifax Town, Rotherham United and York City and in non-League football for Goole Town (as player-manager), Burton Albion and Scarborough. He was a Wales schoolboy and under-23 international. He worked as player coach at York City and  reserve team and youth team coach at Doncaster Rovers.

References

1947 births
Living people
Footballers from Caerphilly
Welsh footballers
Wales under-23 international footballers
Association football defenders
Association football wingers
Newport County A.F.C. players
Chesterfield F.C. players
Halifax Town A.F.C. players
Rotherham United F.C. players
York City F.C. players
Goole Town F.C. players
Burton Albion F.C. players
Scarborough F.C. players
English Football League players
Welsh football managers
Goole Town F.C. managers
Doncaster Rovers F.C. non-playing staff
York City F.C. non-playing staff